Ansonia muelleri, commonly known as Mueller's toad, is a species of toad in the family Bufonidae. It is endemic to the Philippines.

Its natural habitats are subtropical or tropical dry forests, subtropical or tropical moist lowland forests, subtropical or tropical moist montane forests, rivers, intermittent rivers, and freshwater springs.
It is threatened by habitat loss.

References

muelleri
Amphibians of the Philippines
Endemic fauna of the Philippines
Taxonomy articles created by Polbot
Amphibians described in 1887